Firmin De Coster (25 June 1930 – 17 May 2006) was a Belgian footballer. He played in one match for the Belgium national football team in 1956.

References

External links
 

1930 births
2006 deaths
Belgian footballers
Belgium international footballers
Place of birth missing
Association football midfielders